Arthur Atkins may refer to:

Arthur Atkins (painter) (1873–1899), tonalist landscape painter
Arthur Atkins (footballer) (1925–1988), English footballer

See also
Arthur Atkin (1893–1952), English footballer